The FIS Ski Flying World Cup is an annual competition in ski flying, contested as part of the FIS Ski Jumping World Cup and organized by International Ski Federation. It should not be confused with the FIS Ski Flying World Championships, which are a separate one-off event contested biennially during the World Cup season, but with points not counting towards it. 

Four World Championships in ski flying organized in 1992, 1994, 1996 and 1998 also counted for World Cup points. 

From 1979/80 until 1989/90 ski flying world cup events were organized as K.O.P. Ski Flying Week Tournaments and were not awarded with trophies but counted in overall ranking. Ski Flying World Cup was first time officially organized from 1990/91 until 2000/01 and after eight years break again since 2008/09 have been awarded with small crystal globe. Only forty competitors can enter the competition. 

First individual event organized in 1980 is the only world cup event in history where single event took three days in total. First team event in history was organized in 2000 in Planica. 

There are six ski flying hills that exists in the world: Planica, Oberstdorf, Vikersund, Kulm, Harrachov and Ironwood. They are joined in the »K.O.P.« (Kulm-Oberstdorf-Planica) ski flying hills association founded in 1962 in  Ljubljana. The only hill located outside of Europe is Ironwood which is expected to be reopened and covered with plastic mate in 2017 as the only flying hill active all year round.

First test flights for women are provided in season 2023/2024 in case women jump technique developed at same speed. According to the results women competition should start next season.

Scoring system 
Each season consists of 2–7 competitions, usually two competitions on the same hill during a weekend. One competition consists of a qualifying round, first round and second round. The top 10 jumpers in FIS ranking qualify directly to the first round, while the rest of the jumpers fight for the remaining 30 spots. The top 30 men in the first round advance to the second round, which is held in reverse order, so the best jumper in the first round jumps last. The aggregate score in the first and second rounds determine the competition results. The top 30 are awarded World Cup points. The winner gets 100 points while number 30 receives 1 point. At team events only top 8 receive points.

Individual

Men's team

Full list

Individual

Team

World Cup standings

Ski Flying

Nations Cup unofficial

Stats

Wins

Podiums

Top ten appearances 

update: 19 March 2023

Medals table

Individual 
(As of 19 March 2023)

Team events 
(As of 26 March 2022)

Titles

Titles by country 
As of 27 March 2022

Individual wins by country 
As of 19 March 2023

Total wins by country 
As of 19 March 2023

Individual team wins 
As of 27 March 2022

Various

Timeline calendar 

Last updated: 18 March 2023

Individual hosts

Team hosts

Most points in a ski flying season

Ski flying rankings overall leader 

updated: 18 March 2023

officially awarded seasons only (1991–2001, 2009–present)

References
Ski Flying World Cup calendar fis-ski.com

 
Ski flying
Ski flying
Recurring sporting events established in 1991